Rekha Thapa is a Nepalese film actress. She is considered one of the most successful actresses in Nepali cinema. She was a top ten finalist for Miss Nepal in the year 1999. She made her film debut two years later in Chhabiraj Ojha's Hero. She has appeared in approximately 200 Nepali films and rose to prominence in the Nepali film industry due to her glamorous role, which was novel to the traditional audience. She owns the movie production house Rekha Entertainment. She won the CG Digital Film Awards for Best Actress, and in 2011 she also won the NEFTA Film Awards for Best Actress. 

Thapa is also well-known for speaking out on social and political issues, particularly women's rights. She is recognized for establishing herself in the Nepali cinema business at a time when every film was solely focused on male leads; as a result, she is frequently referred to as a "female hero" rather than a "heroine" of a film.

Biography
Rekha Thapa was born in Salakpur in Morang district of Eastern Nepal. After graduating from school, she moved to Kathmandu for higher studies. As she had a strong desire to be an actress, she continued to participate in various modeling glances & glamorous programs. Later she took part in the Miss Nepal Pageant in 1999 and ended up in Top 10. Thapa adheres to Hinduism.

Personal life 
In February 2022, Thapa did a court marriage with Balram Shahi. This was her second marriage; she was married to film producer Chhabiraj Ojha earlier, they divorced in 2012; since then she was living with her mother.

In the media

Thapa's entry in a top Political Party UCPN (Maoist) amidst a public program at party headquarters office of UCPN (Maoist) in Koteshwor, Kathmandu has been criticized by some of her fans. In November 2009, while protesting for Unified Communist Party of Nepal (Maoist) on supremacy in the government, Rekha Thapa was seen dancing with the Prachanda who encircled Durbar Square, the government headquarter. In December 2009, Rekha Thapa was seen kissing the shortest man in the world, Khagendra Thapa Magar.

Rekha Thapa was on the cover page of Wave Magazine in June 2013.

Rekha Thapa ended her relationship with her husband and film producer Chhabi Raj Ojha in 2012. She has been dating Sudarshan Gautam, a disabled non-resident Nepali (NRN). In an interview, Sudarshan Gautam had also admitted on the possibility of marriage. Rekha later revealed that the affair with Sudarsan Gautam was a publicity stunt.

In politics

In 2013, Thapa joined the Unified Communist Party of Nepal (Maoist). However, a year later, she announced that she was no longer associated with that political party. 

Thapa joined Rastriya Prajatantra Party (RPP) on 12 December 2016.
In February 2017, Thapa was elected as a central member of RPP. A number of other popular faces, such as singer Komal Oli, and lawmakers Kunti Shahi and Pratibha Rana were also elected.

Filmography

References

External links
 
 

Living people
People from Morang District
Rastriya Prajatantra Party politicians
Year of birth missing (living people)
Nepalese film actresses
Actresses in Nepali cinema
Nepalese women film directors
Nepalese film producers
Nepalese women film producers
Nepalese film directors
Nepalese Hindus
21st-century Nepalese film directors
21st-century Nepalese actresses
20th-century Nepalese actresses
Nepalese actor-politicians